Fiona Benson (born 25 May 1992) is a Canadian middle-distance runner. She competed in the 800 metres event at the 2015 World Championships in Athletics in Beijing, China.

Career
From 2011 to 2015 she ran at Trinity Western University.

Benson began the 2015 season with a 10k on the road at Vancouver Sun Run where she ran 35:49. In April 2015, she had a personal best of 2:07. Benson started a string of personal best on May 30, 2015 at the 2015 Christie-Phoenix Insurance Victoria Run Series where she won in 2:01.58. She then won the 2015 Victoria International Track Classic in a then personal best time of 2:01.02. She ran the team standard to represent Canada at the 2015 World Championships in Athletics, where she again ran a personal best time of 1:59.59 in the semi-finals of the 800 metres, placing 17th overall.

Personal bests
 Mile (2015): 4:25.79
 800 (2015): 1:59.59

References

External links
 
 

1992 births
Living people
Canadian female middle-distance runners
World Athletics Championships athletes for Canada
Place of birth missing (living people)